Sir Edmund Anthony Harley Lechmere, 3rd Baronet (8 December 1826 – 18 December 1894) was a British Conservative Party politician who sat in the House of Commons between 1866 and 1895. He was a pioneer of the Red Cross.

Lechmere was the son of Sir Edmund Hungerford Lechmere, 2nd Baronet of Hanley Castle, Worcestershire and his wife Maria Clara Murray, daughter of Hon. David Murray, brother of Alexander Murray, 7th Lord Elibank. He was educated at Charterhouse School and Christ Church, Oxford. In 1852 he inherited the baronetcy on the death of his father. He was a senior partner in the Worcester Old Bank. In 1862 he was High Sheriff of Worcestershire. Through his son, Anthony Hungerford Lechmere1 (1868-1954), he  was the father-in-law of  Cecily Mary Bridges (1884-1964) whose first husband was William George Lupton (1871 - 1911) of Leeds. Cecily and her second husband - Anthony Hungerford Lechmere - were the parents of Sir Reginald Anthony Hungerford Lechmere, 7th Baronet (1920-2010).

In March 1866 Lechmere was elected at a by-election as one of the two Members of Parliament (MPs) for Tewkesbury,
but when the borough's representation was reduced to one seat at the 1868 general election, he was defeated by the Liberal Party candidate William Edwin Price. He contested Tewkesbury again in 1874, without success, but in July 1876 he was elected at a by-election as MP for Western Worcestershire. After the Redistribution of Seats Act 1885, he was elected at the 1885 general election as MP for Bewdley. He held the seat until the 1892 general election, when he was elected as MP for Evesham. He held that seat until his death.

Lechmere gave an annual prize for history at the Oxford Military College in Cowley and Oxford Oxfordshire from 1876 to 1896.

Lechmere and his wife were among the founders of Venerable Order of St John. They had travelled several times to Jerusalem and were involved in the establishment of The St John of Jerusalem Eye Hospital.

Lechmere married Louisa Katherine Haigh (1837–1904), only daughter and heiress of John or Joseph Haigh of Whitwell Hall at York, on 30 September 1858. Her father, the son of a wealthy textile merchant with origins in Golcar, was born at Spring Grove, Huddersfield in 1805. (See here  for Haigh's will.)

References

the Peerage.com

External links 
 

1826 births
1894 deaths
Baronets in the Baronetage of the United Kingdom
Conservative Party (UK) MPs for English constituencies
UK MPs 1865–1868
UK MPs 1874–1880
UK MPs 1880–1885
UK MPs 1885–1886
UK MPs 1886–1892
People educated at Charterhouse School
Alumni of Christ Church, Oxford
High Sheriffs of Worcestershire